Lysica is a village and municipality in Žilina District in the Žilina Region of northern Slovakia.

History
In historical records the village was first mentioned in 1475.

Geography
The municipality lies at an altitude of 500 metres and covers an area of 15.527 km2. It has a population of about 859 people.

External links
https://web.archive.org/web/20080111223415/http://www.statistics.sk/mosmis/eng/run.html

Villages and municipalities in Žilina District